Alfred Vivian Minchin (27 January 1917 – February 1998) was a British merchant seaman who was taken prisoner by a German destroyer after his ship, the SS Empire Ranger, one of a Murmansk convoy, was sunk by German bombers off Norway. He held the rank of Sturmmann in the Waffen-SS British Free Corps during the Second World War. He was taken prisoner on 28 March 1942. It was he who suggested the name for the British Free Corps. By 8 March 1945 he 'was being treated for scabies in the SS hospital at Lichtefelde-West.' The National Archives holds the depositions for his trial at the Central Criminal Court under reference CRIM 1/485 and a Home Office file on him under reference HO 45/25817. He was 'convicted at Central Criminal Court on 5 February 1946 of conspiring to assist the enemy and sentenced to 7 years penal servitude' for offences against the Defence Regulations. He died in Somerset in February 1998 at the age of 81.

See also
British Free Corps
List of members of the British Free Corps

References

External links 
 "Seamen Committed For Trial." Times, London, England, 3 January 1946: 2. The Times Digital Archive. Web. 18 February 2015.

1917 births
1998 deaths
English members of the British Free Corps
People from Kingston upon Thames
British Merchant Navy personnel of World War II
Shipwreck survivors
People who were court-martialed
Prisoners and detainees of the British military